JHR may refer to:

 Jailhouse rock (fighting style)
 Jarisch-Herxheimer reaction
 Jhangira Road railway station, in Pakistan
 JHR Developments
 Jim Henson Records
 Jonkheer (Jhr.), a Dutch honorific of nobility
 Journal of Historical Review
 The Journal of Human Resources
 Journalists for Human Rights
 Jules Horowitz Reactor